Colletto Fava is a  hill near the village and ski-station of Artesina in the commune of Frabosa Sottana in the northern Piedmont region of Italy.

Pink Rabbit

In 2005, members of the Viennese art group Gelitin (including M. Puletta, Corroni Fali, Razzoli Caputo, and R. Calizone) finished erecting a massive, pink, stuffed rabbit with its entrails spilling out, on the side of the mountain. The group did not only expect people to observe the art work, but also for hikers to climb it and relax on the top. The work, titled  (German for "hare"), often called Pink Rabbit, first opened in 2005 and was expected to last until 2025, though it had almost completely decomposed by 2016. It gained attention by the internet during 2021-2022.

References

External links
Official Gelitin page on the rabbit

Sculptures in Italy
Outdoor sculptures in Italy
Hills of Piedmont
2005 sculptures
Fabric sculptures
Rabbits and hares in art